The 1986 VFL season was the 90th season of the Victorian Football League (VFL), the highest level senior Australian rules football competition in Victoria. The season featured twelve clubs, ran from 29 March until 27 September, and comprised a 22-game home-and-away season followed by a finals series featuring the top five clubs. 

The premiership was won by the Hawthorn Football Club for the sixth time, after it defeated  by 42 points in the 1986 VFL Grand Final.

Night Series
 defeated  9.12 (66) to 5.6 (36) in the final.

Premiership season

Round 1

|- bgcolor="#CCCCFF"
| Home team
| Home team score
| Away team
| Away team score
| Venue
| Crowd
| Date
|- bgcolor="#FFFFFF"
| 
| 10.8 (68)
| 
| 19.19 (133)
| Victoria Park
| 28,634
| 29 March 1986
|- bgcolor="#FFFFFF"
| 
| 19.14 (128)
| 
| 20.18 (138)
| MCG
| 25,219
| 29 March 1986
|- bgcolor="#FFFFFF"
| 
| 11.18 (84)
| 
| 16.16 (112)
| Kardinia Park
| 21,500
| 29 March 1986
|- bgcolor="#FFFFFF"
| 
| 15.11 (101)
| 
| 20.6 (126)
| MCG
| 22,579
| 31 March 1986
|- bgcolor="#FFFFFF"
| 
| 14.23 (107)
| 
| 12.18 (90)
| Western Oval
| 22,499
| 31 March 1986
|- bgcolor="#FFFFFF"
| 
| 17.11 (113)
| 
| 11.11 (77)
| VFL Park
| 48,107
| 31 March 1986

Round 2

|- bgcolor="#CCCCFF"
| Home team
| Home team score
| Away team
| Away team score
| Venue
| Crowd
| Date
|- bgcolor="#FFFFFF"
| 
| 16.12 (108)
| 
| 17.9 (111)
| MCG
| 26,456
| 4 April 1986
|- bgcolor="#FFFFFF"
| 
| 21.10 (136)
| 
| 16.12 (108)
| MCG
| 20,801
| 5 April 1986
|- bgcolor="#FFFFFF"
| 
| 21.22 (148)
| 
| 7.9 (51)
| Windy Hill
| 19,377
| 5 April 1986
|- bgcolor="#FFFFFF"
| 
| 18.17 (125)
| 
| 15.5 (95)
| Princes Park
| 20,528
| 5 April 1986
|- bgcolor="#FFFFFF"
| 
| 10.19 (79)
| 
| 10.9 (69)
| VFL Park
| 20,439
| 5 April 1986
|- bgcolor="#FFFFFF"
| 
| 19.20 (134)
| 
| 15.10 (100)
| SCG
| 20,243
| 6 April 1986

Round 3

|- bgcolor="#CCCCFF"
| Home team
| Home team score
| Away team
| Away team score
| Venue
| Crowd
| Date
|- bgcolor="#FFFFFF"
| 
| 22.22 (154)
| 
| 15.9 (99)
| Princes Park
| 11,274
| 12 April 1986
|- bgcolor="#FFFFFF"
| 
| 15.15 (105)
| 
| 19.18 (132)
| Kardinia Park
| 16,882
| 12 April 1986
|- bgcolor="#FFFFFF"
| 
| 14.20 (104)
| 
| 13.10 (88)
| Victoria Park
| 12,599
| 12 April 1986
|- bgcolor="#FFFFFF"
| 
| 17.10 (112)
| 
| 9.15 (69)
| MCG
| 29,842
| 12 April 1986
|- bgcolor="#FFFFFF"
| 
| 10.9 (69)
| 
| 24.13 (157)
| Moorabbin Oval
| 19,410
| 12 April 1986
|- bgcolor="#FFFFFF"
| 
| 11.15 (81)
| 
| 13.11 (89)
| VFL Park
| 33,546
| 12 April 1986

Round 4

|- bgcolor="#CCCCFF"
| Home team
| Home team score
| Away team
| Away team score
| Venue
| Crowd
| Date
|- bgcolor="#FFFFFF"
| 
| 27.8 (170)
| 
| 17.6 (108)
| Windy Hill
| 18,265
| 19 April 1986
|- bgcolor="#FFFFFF"
| 
| 20.16 (136)
| 
| 13.13 (91)
| Victoria Park
| 19,826
| 19 April 1986
|- bgcolor="#FFFFFF"
| 
| 22.24 (156)
| 
| 10.15 (75)
| Princes Park
| 27,620
| 19 April 1986
|- bgcolor="#FFFFFF"
| 
| 17.14 (116)
| 
| 19.14 (128)
| Moorabbin Oval
| 11,670
| 19 April 1986
|- bgcolor="#FFFFFF"
| 
| 17.11 (113)
| 
| 14.12 (96)
| VFL Park
| 17,223
| 19 April 1986
|- bgcolor="#FFFFFF"
| 
| 20.22 (142)
| 
| 9.12 (66)
| SCG
| 18,766
| 20 April 1986

Round 5

|- bgcolor="#CCCCFF"
| Home team
| Home team score
| Away team
| Away team score
| Venue
| Crowd
| Date
|- bgcolor="#FFFFFF"
| 
| 14.17 (101)
| 
| 16.14 (110)
| MCG
| 40,117
| 25 April 1986
|- bgcolor="#FFFFFF"
| 
| 24.10 (154)
| 
| 14.8 (92)
| MCG
| 40,117
| 25 April 1986
|- bgcolor="#FFFFFF"
| 
| 10.11 (71)
| 
| 8.7 (55)
| VFL Park
| 68,151
| 25 April 1986
|- bgcolor="#FFFFFF"
| 
| 20.15 (135)
| 
| 11.18 (84)
| MCG
| 21,611
| 26 April 1986
|- bgcolor="#FFFFFF"
| 
| 13.26 (104)
| 
| 13.12 (90)
| Victoria Park
| 13,311
| 26 April 1986
|- bgcolor="#FFFFFF"
| 
| 10.20 (80)
| 
| 10.13 (73)
| Western Oval
| 23,683
| 26 April 1986

Round 6

|- bgcolor="#CCCCFF"
| Home team
| Home team score
| Away team
| Away team score
| Venue
| Crowd
| Date
|- bgcolor="#FFFFFF"
| 
| 19.25 (139)
| 
| 15.13 (103)
| MCG
| 13,522
| 2 May 1986
|- bgcolor="#FFFFFF"
| 
| 16.14 (110)
| 
| 13.13 (91)
| Kardinia Park
| 15,411
| 3 May 1986
|- bgcolor="#FFFFFF"
| 
| 11.17 (83)
| 
| 17.19 (121)
| MCG
| 32,472
| 3 May 1986
|- bgcolor="#FFFFFF"
| 
| 17.20 (122)
| 
| 18.13 (121)
| Princes Park
| 12,877
| 3 May 1986
|- bgcolor="#FFFFFF"
| 
| 19.12 (126)
| 
| 15.12 (102)
| VFL Park
| 38,381
| 3 May 1986
|- bgcolor="#FFFFFF"
| 
| 18.12 (120)
| 
| 13.20 (98)
| SCG
| 37,873
| 4 May 1986

Round 7

|- bgcolor="#CCCCFF"
| Home team
| Home team score
| Away team
| Away team score
| Venue
| Crowd
| Date
|- bgcolor="#FFFFFF"
| 
| 18.25 (133)
| 
| 15.10 (100)
| Princes Park
| 17,731
| 10 May 1986
|- bgcolor="#FFFFFF"
| 
| 14.11 (95)
| 
| 10.17 (77)
| Western Oval
| 18,196
| 10 May 1986
|- bgcolor="#FFFFFF"
| 
| 10.14 (74)
| 
| 12.15 (87)
| Moorabbin Oval
| 11,296
| 10 May 1986
|- bgcolor="#FFFFFF"
| 
| 16.9 (105)
| 
| 21.19 (145)
| MCG
| 38,456
| 10 May 1986
|- bgcolor="#FFFFFF"
| 
| 9.15 (69)
| 
| 16.13 (109)
| Victoria Park
| 28,569
| 10 May 1986
|- bgcolor="#FFFFFF"
| 
| 12.17 (89)
| 
| 7.16 (58)
| VFL Park
| 14,504
| 10 May 1986

Round 8

|- bgcolor="#CCCCFF"
| Home team
| Home team score
| Away team
| Away team score
| Venue
| Crowd
| Date
|- bgcolor="#FFFFFF"
| 
| 14.13 (97)
| 
| 18.12 (120)
| Victoria Park
| 12,189
| 17 May 1986
|- bgcolor="#FFFFFF"
| 
| 22.14 (146)
| 
| 12.12 (84)
| Windy Hill
| 14,549
| 17 May 1986
|- bgcolor="#FFFFFF"
| 
| 20.14 (134)
| 
| 16.9 (105)
| Princes Park
| 21,628
| 17 May 1986
|- bgcolor="#FFFFFF"
| 
| 20.12 (132)
| 
| 11.14 (80)
| MCG
| 18,196
| 17 May 1986
|- bgcolor="#FFFFFF"
| 
| 8.11 (59)
| 
| 15.14 (104)
| VFL Park
| 26,032
| 17 May 1986
|- bgcolor="#FFFFFF"
| 
| 16.15 (111)
| 
| 16.16 (112)
| SCG
| 25,103
| 18 May 1986

Round 9

|- bgcolor="#CCCCFF"
| Home team
| Home team score
| Away team
| Away team score
| Venue
| Crowd
| Date
|- bgcolor="#FFFFFF"
| 
| 5.8 (38)
| 
| 6.11 (47)
| Moorabbin Oval
| 12,492
| 24 May 1986
|- bgcolor="#FFFFFF"
| 
| 18.7 (115)
| 
| 10.10 (70)
| Victoria Park
| 14,979
| 24 May 1986
|- bgcolor="#FFFFFF"
| 
| 11.10 (76)
| 
| 16.16 (112)
| MCG
| 41,945
| 24 May 1986
|- bgcolor="#FFFFFF"
| 
| 7.8 (50)
| 
| 4.12 (36)
| Western Oval
| 21,478
| 24 May 1986
|- bgcolor="#FFFFFF"
| 
| 12.11 (83)
| 
| 6.12 (48)
| VFL Park
| 14,478
| 24 May 1986
|- bgcolor="#FFFFFF"
| 
| 12.14 (86)
| 
| 19.5 (119)
| Kardinia Park
| 21,375
| 25 May 1986

Round 10

|- bgcolor="#CCCCFF"
| Home team
| Home team score
| Away team
| Away team score
| Venue
| Crowd
| Date
|- bgcolor="#FFFFFF"
| 
| 21.11 (137)
| 
| 18.13 (121)
| MCG
| 40,301
| 30 May 1986
|- bgcolor="#FFFFFF"
| 
| 19.12 (126)
| 
| 16.14 (110)
| Kardinia Park
| 12,712
| 31 May 1986
|- bgcolor="#FFFFFF"
| 
| 11.13 (79)
| 
| 16.12 (108)
| Princes Park
| 15,784
| 31 May 1986
|- bgcolor="#FFFFFF"
| 
| 6.13 (49)
| 
| 25.15 (165)
| MCG
| 27,440
| 31 May 1986
|- bgcolor="#FFFFFF"
| 
| 19.19 (133)
| 
| 14.7 (91)
| VFL Park
| 24,865
| 31 May 1986
|- bgcolor="#FFFFFF"
| 
| 18.18 (126)
| 
| 14.17 (101)
| SCG
| 23,091
| 1 June 1986

Round 11

|- bgcolor="#CCCCFF"
| Home team
| Home team score
| Away team
| Away team score
| Venue
| Crowd
| Date
|- bgcolor="#FFFFFF"
| 
| 21.19 (145)
| 
| 9.6 (60)
| Princes Park
| 10,919
| 7 June 1986
|- bgcolor="#FFFFFF"
| 
| 18.14 (122)
| 
| 11.12 (78)
| Victoria Park
| 27,166
| 7 June 1986
|- bgcolor="#FFFFFF"
| 
| 13.10 (88)
| 
| 19.12 (126)
| VFL Park
| 21,805
| 7 June 1986
|- bgcolor="#FFFFFF"
| 
| 9.4 (58)
| 
| 10.18 (78)
| Windy Hill
| 27,267
| 9 June 1986
|- bgcolor="#FFFFFF"
| 
| 22.10 (142)
| 
| 9.10 (64)
| Princes Park
| 31,985
| 9 June 1986
|- bgcolor="#FFFFFF"
| 
| 15.7 (97)
| 
| 12.8 (80)
| MCG
| 35,360
| 9 June 1986

Round 12

|- bgcolor="#CCCCFF"
| Home team
| Home team score
| Away team
| Away team score
| Venue
| Crowd
| Date
|- bgcolor="#FFFFFF"
| 
| 13.13 (91)
| 
| 14.11 (95)
| SCG
| 26,581
| 13 June 1986
|- bgcolor="#FFFFFF"
| 
| 17.23 (125)
| 
| 21.8 (134)
| MCG
| 19,032
| 14 June 1986
|- bgcolor="#FFFFFF"
| 
| 22.13 (145)
| 
| 11.11 (77)
| Victoria Park
| 10,987
| 14 June 1986
|- bgcolor="#FFFFFF"
| 
| 10.15 (75)
| 
| 24.10 (154)
| Moorabbin Oval
| 12,520
| 14 June 1986
|- bgcolor="#FFFFFF"
| 
| 13.16 (94)
| 
| 18.12 (120)
| VFL Park
| 27,611
| 14 June 1986
|- bgcolor="#FFFFFF"
| 
| 19.19 (133)
| 
| 16.14 (110)
| MCG
| 57,634
| 15 June 1986

Round 13

|- bgcolor="#CCCCFF"
| Home team
| Home team score
| Away team
| Away team score
| Venue
| Crowd
| Date
|- bgcolor="#FFFFFF"
| 
| 21.26 (152)
| 
| 13.14 (92)
| Princes Park
| 16,145
| 21 June 1986
|- bgcolor="#FFFFFF"
| 
| 14.11 (95)
| 
| 14.12 (96)
| Victoria Park
| 27,611
| 21 June 1986
|- bgcolor="#FFFFFF"
| 
| 15.11 (101)
| 
| 7.7 (49)
| Moorabbin Oval
| 11,242
| 21 June 1986
|- bgcolor="#FFFFFF"
| 
| 22.11 (143)
| 
| 8.7 (55)
| Western Oval
| 16,318
| 21 June 1986
|- bgcolor="#FFFFFF"
| 
| 11.11 (77)
| 
| 12.17 (89)
| Kardinia Park
| 17,646
| 21 June 1986
|- bgcolor="#FFFFFF"
| 
| 11.7 (73)
| 
| 19.18 (132)
| VFL Park
| 26,231
| 21 June 1986

Round 14

|- bgcolor="#CCCCFF"
| Home team
| Home team score
| Away team
| Away team score
| Venue
| Crowd
| Date
|- bgcolor="#FFFFFF"
| 
| 8.8 (56)
| 
| 12.13 (85)
| Windy Hill
| 21,382
| 28 June 1986
|- bgcolor="#FFFFFF"
| 
| 17.13 (115)
| 
| 9.14 (68)
| Victoria Park
| 21,351
| 28 June 1986
|- bgcolor="#FFFFFF"
| 
| 24.19 (163)
| 
| 11.10 (76)
| Princes Park
| 14,760
| 28 June 1986
|- bgcolor="#FFFFFF"
| 
| 11.8 (74)
| 
| 26.19 (175)
| MCG
| 20,264
| 28 June 1986
|- bgcolor="#FFFFFF"
| 
| 17.13 (115)
| 
| 11.5 (71)
| VFL Park
| 10,049
| 28 June 1986
|- bgcolor="#FFFFFF"
| 
| 17.11 (113)
| 
| 13.13 (91)
| SCG
| 22,106
| 29 June 1986

Round 15

|- bgcolor="#CCCCFF"
| Home team
| Home team score
| Away team
| Away team score
| Venue
| Crowd
| Date
|- bgcolor="#FFFFFF"
| 
| 13.8 (86)
| 
| 16.18 (114)
| MCG
| 16,975
| 4 July 1986
|- bgcolor="#FFFFFF"
| 
| 8.11 (59)
| 
| 5.8 (38)
| Princes Park
| 6,488
| 5 July 1986
|- bgcolor="#FFFFFF"
| 
| 11.4 (70)
| 
| 12.14 (86)
| Western Oval
| 21,863
| 5 July 1986
|- bgcolor="#FFFFFF"
| 
| 8.12 (60)
| 
| 27.20 (182)
| MCG
| 21,560
| 5 July 1986
|- bgcolor="#FFFFFF"
| 
| 8.10 (58)
| 
| 19.15 (129)
| Kardinia Park
| 18,067
| 5 July 1986
|- bgcolor="#FFFFFF"
| 
| 8.11 (59)
| 
| 7.11 (53)
| VFL Park
| 14,962
| 5 July 1986

Round 16

|- bgcolor="#CCCCFF"
| Home team
| Home team score
| Away team
| Away team score
| Venue
| Crowd
| Date
|- bgcolor="#FFFFFF"
| 
| 16.16 (112)
| 
| 13.7 (85)
| Kardinia Park
| 9,480
| 12 July 1986
|- bgcolor="#FFFFFF"
| 
| 13.14 (92)
| 
| 22.17 (149)
| MCG
| 24,506
| 12 July 1986
|- bgcolor="#FFFFFF"
| 
| 6.14 (50)
| 
| 17.15 (117)
| VFL Park
| 10,272
| 12 July 1986
|- bgcolor="#FFFFFF"
| 
| 24.18 (162)
| 
| 15.13 (103)
| SCG
| 33,192
| 13 July 1986
|- bgcolor="#FFFFFF"
| 
| 17.20 (122)
| 
| 14.11 (95)
| Western Oval
| 19,341
| 19 July 1986
|- bgcolor="#FFFFFF"
| 
| 12.13 (85)
| 
| 20.12 (132)
| VFL Park
| 34,488
| 19 July 1986

Round 17

|- bgcolor="#CCCCFF"
| Home team
| Home team score
| Away team
| Away team score
| Venue
| Crowd
| Date
|- bgcolor="#FFFFFF"
| 
| 15.15 (105)
| 
| 11.14 (80)
| MCG
| 51,646
| 20 July 1986
|- bgcolor="#FFFFFF"
| 
| 20.9 (129)
| 
| 7.12 (54)
| Moorabbin Oval
| 11,889
| 26 July 1986
|- bgcolor="#FFFFFF"
| 
| 6.9 (45)
| 
| 14.12 (96)
| Princes Park
| 9,876
| 26 July 1986
|- bgcolor="#FFFFFF"
| 
| 19.9 (123)
| 
| 22.10 (142)
| VFL Park
| 10,091
| 26 July 1986
|- bgcolor="#FFFFFF"
| 
| 11.10 (76)
| 
| 9.11 (65)
| MCG
| 49,124
| 26 July 1986
|- bgcolor="#FFFFFF"
| 
| 29.15 (189)
| 
| 9.11 (65)
| SCG
| 19,110
| 27 July 1986

Round 18

|- bgcolor="#CCCCFF"
| Home team
| Home team score
| Away team
| Away team score
| Venue
| Crowd
| Date
|- bgcolor="#FFFFFF"
| 
| 21.11 (137)
| 
| 6.14 (50)
| Windy Hill
| 21,320
| 2 August 1986
|- bgcolor="#FFFFFF"
| 
| 13.14 (92)
| 
| 16.9 (105)
| Victoria Park
| 10,943
| 2 August 1986
|- bgcolor="#FFFFFF"
| 
| 15.14 (104)
| 
| 12.15 (87)
| Princes Park
| 27,644
| 2 August 1986
|- bgcolor="#FFFFFF"
| 
| 13.12 (90)
| 
| 19.13 (127)
| Moorabbin Oval
| 11,413
| 2 August 1986
|- bgcolor="#FFFFFF"
| 
| 11.19 (85)
| 
| 13.16 (94)
| MCG
| 15,200
| 2 August 1986
|- bgcolor="#FFFFFF"
| 
| 11.13 (79)
| 
| 10.16 (76)
| VFL Park
| 11,460
| 2 August 1986

Round 19

|- bgcolor="#CCCCFF"
| Home team
| Home team score
| Away team
| Away team score
| Venue
| Crowd
| Date
|- bgcolor="#FFFFFF"
| 
| 24.16 (160)
| 
| 11.9 (75)
| Victoria Park
| 8,311
| 9 August 1986
|- bgcolor="#FFFFFF"
| 
| 18.19 (127)
| 
| 17.18 (120)
| MCG
| 32,635
| 9 August 1986
|- bgcolor="#FFFFFF"
| 
| 20.20 (140)
| 
| 10.23 (83)
| MCG
| 32,635
| 9 August 1986
|- bgcolor="#FFFFFF"
| 
| 23.16 (154)
| 
| 11.9 (75)
| VFL Park
| 30,349
| 9 August 1986
|- bgcolor="#FFFFFF"
| 
| 10.13 (73)
| 
| 27.9 (171)
| SCG
| 39,763
| 10 August 1986
|- bgcolor="#FFFFFF"
| 
| 21.10 (136)
| 
| 12.15 (87)
| MCG
| 72,505
| 10 August 1986

Round 20

|- bgcolor="#CCCCFF"
| Home team
| Home team score
| Away team
| Away team score
| Venue
| Crowd
| Date
|- bgcolor="#FFFFFF"
| 
| 14.12 (96)
| 
| 21.18 (144)
| MCG
| 16,141
| 16 August 1986
|- bgcolor="#FFFFFF"
| 
| 19.14 (128)
| 
| 10.11 (71)
| Western Oval
| 11,924
| 16 August 1986
|- bgcolor="#FFFFFF"
| 
| 6.12 (48)
| 
| 11.16 (82)
| Moorabbin Oval
| 13,171
| 16 August 1986
|- bgcolor="#FFFFFF"
| 
| 20.24 (144)
| 
| 10.12 (72)
| Princes Park
| 16,597
| 16 August 1986
|- bgcolor="#FFFFFF"
| 
| 16.12 (108)
| 
| 10.19 (79)
| Kardinia Park
| 11,987
| 16 August 1986
|- bgcolor="#FFFFFF"
| 
| 14.9 (93)
| 
| 9.7 (61)
| VFL Park
| 15,931
| 16 August 1986

Round 21

|- bgcolor="#CCCCFF"
| Home team
| Home team score
| Away team
| Away team score
| Venue
| Crowd
| Date
|- bgcolor="#FFFFFF"
| 
| 28.14 (182)
| 
| 14.13 (97)
| MCG
| 15,110
| 23 August 1986
|- bgcolor="#FFFFFF"
| 
| 8.13 (61)
| 
| 14.12 (96)
| Windy Hill
| 18,910
| 23 August 1986
|- bgcolor="#FFFFFF"
| 
| 23.18 (156)
| 
| 8.7 (55)
| Victoria Park
| 17,800
| 23 August 1986
|- bgcolor="#FFFFFF"
| 
| 35.15 (225)
| 
| 13.12 (90)
| Princes Park
| 9,848
| 23 August 1986
|- bgcolor="#FFFFFF"
| 
| 23.13 (151)
| 
| 10.12 (72)
| VFL Park
| 28,697
| 23 August 1986
|- bgcolor="#FFFFFF"
| 
| 20.20 (140)
| 
| 16.15 (111)
| SCG
| 18,179
| 24 August 1986

Round 22

|- bgcolor="#CCCCFF"
| Home team
| Home team score
| Away team
| Away team score
| Venue
| Crowd
| Date
|- bgcolor="#FFFFFF"
| 
| 7.13 (55)
| 
| 19.11 (125)
| Western Oval
| 15,196
| 30 August 1986
|- bgcolor="#FFFFFF"
| 
| 9.19 (73)
| 
| 8.15 (63)
| Victoria Park
| 17,141
| 30 August 1986
|- bgcolor="#FFFFFF"
| 
| 10.19 (79)
| 
| 15.11 (101)
| Windy Hill
| 17,982
| 30 August 1986
|- bgcolor="#FFFFFF"
| 
| 20.19 (139)
| 
| 6.17 (53)
| Princes Park
| 17,455
| 30 August 1986
|- bgcolor="#FFFFFF"
| 
| 15.14 (104)
| 
| 20.16 (136)
| MCG
| 13,569
| 30 August 1986
|- bgcolor="#FFFFFF"
| 
| 11.7 (73)
| 
| 18.17 (125)
| VFL Park
| 30,442
| 30 August 1986

This was the round where Brian Taylor kicked his 100th goal of the season.

Ladder

Finals

Elimination Finals

|- bgcolor="#CCCCFF"
| Home team
| Score
| Away team
| Score
| Venue
| Attendance
| Date
|- bgcolor="#FFFFFF"
| 
| 8.10 (58)
| 
| 8.9 (57)
| Waverley Park
| 59,420
| Saturday, 6 September

Qualifying final

|- bgcolor="#CCCCFF"
| Home team
| Score
| Away team
| Score
| Venue
| Attendance
| Date
|- bgcolor="#FFFFFF"
| 
| 15.14 (104)
| 
| 18.12 (120)
| MCG
| 66,016
| Sunday, 7 September

Semi-finals

|- bgcolor="#CCCCFF"
| Home team
| Score
| Away team
| Score
| Venue
| Attendance
| Date
|- bgcolor="#FFFFFF"
| 
| 13.6 (84)
| 
| 16.16 (112)
| Waverley Park
| 62,315
| Saturday, 13 September
|- bgcolor="#FFFFFF"
| 
| 13.11 (89)
| 
| 13.16 (94)
| MCG
| 65,763
| Sunday, 14 September

Preliminary final

|- bgcolor="#CCCCFF"
| Home team
| Score
| Away team
| Score
| Venue
| Attendance
| Date
|- bgcolor="#FFFFFF"
| 
| 16.14 (110)
| 
| 7.12 (54)
| Waverley Park
| 68,339
| Saturday, 20 September

Grand Final

|- bgcolor="#CCCCFF"
| Home team
| Score
| Away team
| Score
| Venue
| Attendance
| Date
|- bgcolor="#FFFFFF"
| 
| 9.14 (68)
| 
| 16.14 (110) 
| MCG
| 101,861
| Saturday, 27 September

Awards 
 The Brownlow Medal was awarded to both Greg Williams of the Sydney Swans and Robert "Dipper" DiPierdomenico of the Hawthorn Hawks  
 The Leigh Matthews Trophy was awarded to Paul Roos of Fitzroy. 
 The Coleman Medal was awarded to Brian Taylor of Collingwood. 
 The Norm Smith Medal was awarded to Gary Ayres of Hawthorn. 
 The wooden spoon was "awarded" to St Kilda.
  won the reserves premiership. Carlton 22.14 (146) defeated  10.12 (72) in the grand final, held as a curtain-raiser to the seniors Grand Final on 27 September at the Melbourne Cricket Ground.

Notable events
 For the first time in VFL/AFL history, two senior games were held at the same venue on the same day with Melbourne hosting Sydney, followed by North Melbourne vs Geelong at the MCG in round 5. Another double header was staged in round 19 at the MCG with Melbourne and North Melbourne again the home teams against Geelong and Footscray respectively. It would be 34 years before this occurred again.
 In Round 21, Hawthorn led Geelong by only three points at half-time, but then kicked 25.7 (157) to 3.7 (25) in the second half. Hawthorn's final score of 35.15 (225) set a new record as the club's highest score (since surpassed in 1991) and Geelong's highest score conceded (still a record as of 2021), and the margin of 135 points set and holds the record for Geelong's highest losing margin. Hawthorn's 25.7 (157) set and holds the record for highest score by a single team in a half of football.
 Round 22 was the last round in VFL/AFL history in which all matches were played on the same day.
  endured serious financial hardships during 1986 which threatened its existence. More than one million dollars in debt, and having posted a $600,000 loss in 1985, the club took a $500,000 loan from the VFL in January 1986, and needed another $500,000 by the end of the year to remain solvent. Despite the off-field struggles, the club reached the preliminary final; it was the last time the club played finals before its merger with Brisbane at the end of 1996.

See also
 McIntyre "final five" system

References

 Stephen Rodgers: Every Game Ever Played VFL/AFL Results 1897–1991 3rd Edition 1992. Penguin Books Australia .
 1986 Season – AFL Tables

Australian Football League seasons
VFL season